Bessho is a Japanese surname. Notable people with the surname include:

, Japanese baseball player
, Japanese actor and radio presenter
, Japanese daimyō

Japanese-language surnames